Beijing World Youth Academy, or, BWYA, is an international school that serves students from Kindergarten to Grade 12 located at Laiguangying of Beijing, China.

References

External links
 Beijing World Youth Academy
  Beijing World Youth Academy

Schools in Chaoyang District, Beijing
International schools in Beijing